Nerul (Pronunciation: [neɾuːɭ]) is an upmarket residential and commercial node in Navi Mumbai, Maharashtra, India.

 Nerul is located in the Harbour Line, Trans-Harbour Lines and Nerul-Uran Line of Mumbai local train network where Kharghar and Vashi are the nearby stations. Nerul node is also famous for its parallel-running Palm-Beach Marg. Nerul is quite famous for its gardens like the Rock Garden and state of the art building structures.

Geography 

Nerul's water pond at sector-18 opposite to sector-20 on Jai Bhavani road, is surrounded by residential complexes and a play park for children. The pond is decorated by surrounding coconut trees. During festivals like Ganesh Chaturthi and Navaratri, idols of Lord Ganesha and Goddess Durga are immersed here in this pond. This pond is thirteen feet deep and has a parallelogram shape.

Another pond is there in sector-23 which is known as Darave Talav.

If you want to hang out in Nerul there are many places to look for such as DY Patil Stadium, Parsik Hills, Jewels of Navi Mumbai, Sector 18 cha Naka, Rock Garden, Balaji Hills, Flamingo Point, Nerul Jetty, Someshwar Mandir, Shiv Mandir, Shani Mandir, Sector 28.

Educational institutions

ICSE affiliated school 
1) Ryan International School Nerul

2) Presentation Convent School

CBSE affiliated schools
 Apeejay School
 D.A.V Public School, Nerul
 Ryan International School
 Delhi Public School

Maharashtra Board affiliated schools and junior colleges
 St. Xavier's High School & Junior College of Science
 MGM HIGH SCHOOL AND JR. COLLEGE OF SCIENCE & LAW COLLEGE
St. Augustine's High school 
 SBOA Public School

Engineering colleges
 Ramrao Adik Institute of Technology
 Terna Engineering College
 SIES Graduate School of Technology

General degree colleges
 SIES College of Arts, Science & Commerce

Medical college
Terna Medical College

Law College
MGM Law College
DY Patil Law College

References

External links 
  https://www.NerulCity.in/

 
 Nerul Information

Nodes of Navi Mumbai